Wessex Mills Group is a small non-profit society formed in June 2003 to act as a centre for the wind and watermill heritage of the counties of Devon, Dorset, Somerset and Wiltshire in the United Kingdom. It sees itself as complementary to existing local organisations such as the local industrial archaeology societies of its area.  The Group draws its membership from a wide range of people, from those with a professional link with mills (including mill owners) to those with a general amateur interest.  The Group meets regularly and publishes a quarterly newsletter.

External links
 Wessex Mills Group website

References

Conservation in England
Non-profit organisations based in the United Kingdom
Wessex
2003 establishments in England
Organizations established in 2003